The Hundred of Milne refers to a cadastral unit (land division). It may refer to:
 Hundred of Colton (Northern Territory)
 Hundred of Colton (South Australia)